Jean Vigny (5 October 1919 – 7 September 2020) was a Franco-Swiss actor. Over the course of his long career, he acted in theater, musicals, film, television, and radio.

References

External links
 
 Jean Vigny | Accueil

1919 births
2020 deaths
20th-century French male actors
French male stage actors
French male musical theatre actors
French male film actors
French male television actors